Kfar Saba–Nordau railway station (also known as Kostyuk) is a passenger railway station located at the town boundary of Hod HaSharon and Kfar Saba, Israel. The station was opened on 13 April 2003 as the beginning of the new Sharon Railway. Eleven days later, on 24 April 2003, a suicide bomber approached the new train station and activated the bomb he was carrying, murdering Alexander Kostyuk, the security guard who had prompted him for identification, and wounding 13 others. The station was later named after Kostyuk who prevented the bomber from entering the station.

The station platforms are located in the median of Route 531 which separates Kfar Saba from Hod HaSharon; the only access to the platforms is via the station building on HaTsabarim St at Kfar Saba's side of the highway. Accordingly, the station is named "Kfar Saba", even though HaTsabarim St, including the station itself, is within the municipal boundaries of Hod HaSharon. Between September 2006 and March 2010, the station was named Hod Hasharon station.

Train service

Ridership

References

External links
Israel railways web site
On the Platform – information website

Railway stations in Central District (Israel)
Railway stations opened in 2003
2003 establishments in Israel
Kfar Saba